Abbasabad-e Moin (also Romanized as ‘Abbāsābād-e Mo‘īn; also known as ‘Abbāsābād, ‘Abbāsābād-e Khān, and Asadābād) is a village in Eslamiyeh Rural District, in the Central District of Rafsanjan County, Kerman Province, Iran. At the 2006 census, its population was 26, in 6 families.

References 

Populated places in Rafsanjan County